Sha Tin Road, opened on 6 November 1984, is a dual-2 lane expressway in Hong Kong. It links Lion Rock Tunnel Road and Tai Po Road — Sha Tin, forming a part of Route 1.

This 3.4 km road is mostly elevated, running at the foothills on the eastern bank of the Shing Mun River, bypassing the town centre of Sha Tin, which is to its west. The road crosses the river on Dragon Bridge near City One and joins Tai Po Road - Sha Tin near the Sha Tin Racecourse.

Interchanges and Junctions

The section of Route 1 that runs through Sha Tin Road has 6 exits. They are numbered 11A, 11B, 12, 12A, 12B, and 12C. The entire road is in Sha Tin District.
{| class="plainrowheaders wikitable"
|-
|colspan=5 style="background:#f2f2f2; text-align:center"| Sha Tin Road
|-
!scope=col|Location
!scope=col|km
!scope=col|Exit
!scope=col|Destinations
!scope=col|Notes
|-
|rowspan=3|Sha Tin Wai
|style="text-align:right"|17.4
|style="text-align:center"|
|Lion Rock Tunnel Road - Tai Wai, Kowloon
|Southern terminus;  continues
|-
|style="text-align:right"|17.4
|style="background:#dff9f9; text-align:center"|11A
|style="background:#dff9f9;"|Lion Rock Tunnel Road - Tsuen Wan, Sha Tin Central
|style="background:#dff9f9;"|Northbound exit and southbound entrance only
|-
|style="text-align:right"|18.3
|style="text-align:center"|11B
| Sha Lek Highway - Ma On Shan, Kowloon East
|Northbound exit and southbound entrance only
|-
|rowspan=2|Yuen Chau Kok
|style="text-align:right"|18.8
|style="text-align:center"|12
|Sha Tin Wai Road - Sha Tin Wai, Yuen Chau Kok, Kowloon East
|
|-
|style="text-align:right"|19.5
|style="text-align:center"|12A
|Fo Tan Road / Tai Chung Kiu Road - Fo Tan, Shek Mun
|Northbound exit and southbound entrance only
|-
|rowspan=3|Fo Tan
|style="text-align:right"|20.4
|style="text-align:center"|12B
|Fo Tan Road - Sha Tin Central
|Southbound exit and northbound entrance only
|-
|style="text-align:right"|21.1
|style="text-align:center"|12C
|Yuen Wo Road - Penfold Park
|Northbound exit and southbound entrance only
|-
|style="text-align:right"|21.1
|style="text-align:center"|
| ( Tai Po Road — Sha Tin) northbound - Ma Liu Shui, Tai Po
|Northern terminus; end of

See also
 List of streets and roads in Hong Kong
 Tate's Cairn Highway
 Tsing Kwai Highway
 Tuen Mun Road
 West Kowloon Highway

References

External links 

 

Expressways in Hong Kong
Sha Tin District
Route 1 (Hong Kong)
1984 establishments in Hong Kong
Roads in the New Territories